A Blue Gum Romance is a 1913 Australian silent film directed by Franklyn Barrett. It is considered a lost film.

Plot
The film was described as "a Sensational Story of Love, jealousy and revenge".

Cast
Tien Hogue as heroine
Tom Middleton as hero
Douglas Lotherington as aboriginal chief

Production
It was the first narrative film from the Fraser Film Release and Photographic Company.

The film was set in the timber industry area near Gosford and Wooy, although interiors were shot in Sydney. The aboriginal characters were played by white actors in blackface.

Filming was completed by July 1913.

Reception
The film was popular at the local box office and screened in England and the USA. A contemporary review said the film "seemed to find favour with the spectators."

The film was picked up for distribution in the US by the Essanay Company and "met with success".

References

External links

A Blue Gum Romance at National Film and Sound Archive

1913 films
Australian drama films
Australian silent short films
Australian black-and-white films
Lost Australian films
1913 lost films
Lost drama films
Films directed by Franklyn Barrett
Silent drama films